Germigny-sur-Loire (literally Germigny on Loire) is a commune in the Nièvre department in central France.

Demographics
On 1 January 2019, the estimated population was 769.

See also
 Communes of the Nièvre department

References

Communes of Nièvre